Charles-André Doudin (born 12 September 1986) is a Swiss professional footballer who plays as an attacking midfielder.

Career
Born in Payerne, Doudin has played for Neuchâtel Xamax, Meyrin, Delémont, La Chaux-de-Fonds, Lugano and Biel-Bienne.

In December 2016 he signed a new contract with Neuchâtel Xamax, until 2019.

References

1986 births
Living people
Swiss men's footballers
Neuchâtel Xamax FCS players
SR Delémont players
FC La Chaux-de-Fonds players
FC Meyrin players
FC Lugano players
FC Biel-Bienne players
Swiss Super League players
Swiss Challenge League players
Association football midfielders
People from Payerne
Sportspeople from the canton of Vaud